The Women's individual pursuit (LC 1-2/CP 4) event at the Summer Paralympics took place on September 10 at the Laoshan Velodrome.

Preliminaries 
Q = Qualifier
WR = World Record

Finals 
Gold medal match

Bronze medal match

References 

Women's individual pursuit (LC 1-2 CP 4)
2008 in women's track cycling